Pam Brady is an American writer and television producer, best known for her work with South Park creators Trey Parker and Matt Stone.

Career 
Pam Brady first met Parker, Stone and Jason McHugh while working under Brian Graden at the Fox Broadcasting Company. Brady suggested that the two make a weekly version of their student film Cannibal! The Musical. The three came up with the idea for Time Warped. While Time Warped was not produced, Parker and Stone decided to make South Park for Comedy Central and brought Brady on as a writer.

Brady is known as the live-action fiancée of Mr. Adler in the episode "Tweek vs. Craig". Although Brady left the show in the fourth season to write Hollywood films and co-create the short-lived series The Loop, she would later co-write Team America: World Police and occasionally produce or consult on episodes of the series. Brady wrote and directed the horror-inspired animated TV series Neighbors from Hell, which premiered in June 2010 on TBS.

Brady began collaborating with Arrested Development creator Mitch Hurwitz to create a television show starring Maria Bamford. The series, Lady Dynamite, was released on Netflix on May 20, 2016.

Writing credits

Television 
 The John Larroquette Show (1993)
 South Park (1997–1999)
 Just Shoot Me! (1999–2000)
 Mr. Wong (2000) (also co-creator)
 Go Fish (2001) (also developer)
 The Loop (2006–2007) (also co-creator)
 Neighbors from Hell (2010) (also creator)
 Lady Dynamite (2016–2017) (also co-creator)

Film 
 South Park: Bigger, Longer & Uncut (1999) – with Trey Parker and Matt Stone
 Team America: World Police (2004) – with Parker and Stone
 Hot Rod (2007)
 Hamlet 2 (2008) – with Andrew Fleming
 The Bubble (2022) – with Judd Apatow
 Ruby Gillman, Teenage Kraken (2023)
 Untitled Smurfs animated film (2025)

References

External links 
 

American comedy writers
American television producers
American television writers
American voice actresses
American women television writers
American women screenwriters
Living people
Year of birth missing (living people)
American women television producers
21st-century American women